Jungle Goddess is a 1948 American action/adventure crime film starring George Reeves, Ralph Byrd, and Wanda McKay. Directed by Lewis D. Collins, the film was based on an idea by producer William Stephens.

Jungle Goddess was later featured in a Season 2 episode of Mystery Science Theater 3000.

Plot
In Africa, pilot Mike Patton is persuaded by his business partner, Bob Simpson, to conduct a search for a missing heiress whose plane supposedly went down in the jungle, resulting in her never being seen again.

Encountering an indigenous tribe of natives, Bob recklessly shoots a man. He is taken before a woman, Greta, who is being treated like a high priestess. Bob is sentenced to die, but when she gets Mike off to herself, Greta pleads with him to help her escape.

During a struggle, a gun goes off and a guard is left dead. With the tribesmen in pursuit, Mike and Greta are betrayed by Bob, who has gone mad. But after he is killed by a spear, Mike and Greta make it to the plane and safely get away.

Cast
 George Reeves as Mike Patton
 Wanda McKay as Greta Vanderhorn
 Ralph Byrd as Bob Simpson
 Armida as Wanama
 Onest Conley as Drummer
 Rudy Robles as Nugara
 Jack Carroll as Accompanist
 Dolores Castle as Yvonne
 Fred Coby as Pilot
 Helena Grant as Mrs. Fitzhugh
 Reed Hadley as Radio Newscaster (uncredited)
 Sam Harris as Bar Patron (uncredited)
 Linda Leighton as Helen Phillips (credited as Linda Johnson)
 Smoki Whitfield as Oolonga the witch doctor
 Zack Williams as Chief M'benga

Production notes
The film was the first to be produced by Robert L. Lippert's independent production company, Lippert Pictures.

Lippert borrowed George Reeves to star and filming began in June 1948.

Reception
A Los Angeles Times reviewer who saw the film in a theater called it "so corny" that the audience "died laughing when they weren't razzing on it." 
Despite this reaction, the film was widely seen, as one of the most watched movies in what were then all 48 states. In 1950 the film was shown as part of a double feature with Treasure Island at the Five Points Theatre in Birmingham, Alabama as well several other theaters around the state. In 1954 Jungle Goddess was shown as part of a double feature with a re-airing of The Lawless Nineties in several media markets.

The film was popular enough for a follow up Green Gold which became Thunder in the Pines.

Home media
In 2006, Jungle Goddess was released on Region 1 DVD in the United States by VCI Home Video. The film was paired with another title starring George Reeves, Thunder in the Pines (1948).

References

External links
 
 
 
 
Review of film at Variety

1948 films
1940s action adventure films
1940s crime films
American crime films
American black-and-white films
1940s English-language films
Films set in Africa
American independent films
Lippert Pictures films
Films directed by Lewis D. Collins
American action adventure films
1940s American films